Seeta Ramula Kalyanam Lankalo  is a 2010 Indian Telugu-language action drama film directed by Eeshwar and starring Nithiin and Hansika Motwani. It was dubbed into Hindi as Dushmano Ka Dushman and into Tamil as Rowdy Kottai. It was remade in Odia in 2014 as Mental, starring Anubhav Mohanty. The music was composed by Anoop Rubens with editing by Kotagiri Venkateswara Rao.

Plot
Chandra Shekhar "Chandu" (Nithiin) is a daredevil youth, a fearless boy. He meets a beautiful girl named Nandhini, "Nandu" (Hansika Motwani), the daughter of a dreaded factionalist named Peddi Reddy (Suman). He falls in love, and starts teasing her and tries to prove that he sincerely loves Nandu. He tells Nandu that he could do anything for her. Nandu tells him that he should not follow her until she calls him. In order to grab her attention, he sends his father (Chandramohan) and mother (Pragathi) to convey his love and let her know that they approve of their relationship. Later, Nandu realises that she too truly loves him. Then, Jaya Prakash Reddy asks Peddi Reddy to marry Nandu to his nephew Veera Pratap Reddy (Salim Baig). Peddi Reddy refuses which ignites factionalism between the two. Just when Nandu wants to express her love to Chandu, she is taken away by her father to their village. The film climaxes when Chandu and Nandu reunite and affirm their love.

Cast

Nithiin as Chandra Shekhar / Chandu / Shekhar
Hansika Motwani as Nandhini "Nandhu"
Suman as Peddi Reddy (Nandhini's father)
Salim Baig as Veera Pratap
Chandra Mohan as Chandu's father
Pragathi as Chandu's mother
Jaya Prakash Reddy as Veera Pratap's father
Brahmanandam as Appalaraju / Pappalaraju
Ali
Subbaraju
Duvvasi Mohan
Venu Madhav
M. S. Narayana
Hema
Satyam Rajesh as Chandu's friend
Fish Venkat
Narsing Yadav

Soundtrack
The music was composed by Anup Rubens and released by Aditya Music.

Reception 
Jeevi of Idlebrain.com called the film "a disappointment". A critic from 123telugu wrote that "Seetha Ramula Kalyanam…Lanka Lo is yet another film which uses the tried and tested formula of love-family entertainer".

References

External links
 
 Seeta Ramula Kalyanam at Rediff.com

2010s Telugu-language films
2010 films
Telugu films remade in other languages